Betty Quin (c. 1922/1923 - 28 August 1993) was an Australian playwright, script writer and series script editor who contributed to numerous soap operas in her native Australia (e.g. The Young Doctors, Sons and Daughters, A Country Practice, Prisoner and Neighbours).

From 1970 to 1977 she ran the Q Theatre Company, an amateur theatre company she co-founded with her husband, Don Quin, in Adelaide. Many of her 22 plays and other Australian works were performed by the company. Robert Stigwood purchased the film rights to her 1970 play, Dinkum Bambino, which had been favourably reviewed by The Advertiser's theatre critic, Mary Armitage.

She was the aunt of Patrea Smallacombe, the Australian-born script writer for Coronation Street and EastEnders.

Betty Quin died on 28 August 1993 at the age of 70.

Works

Plays 

 The Swallow Flies South, 1961
 A Relative Affair, 1962
 The Travelling Kind, 1962
 A Question of Time, 1963
 For Arts Sake, 1964
 The Listeners, 1967
 The Gentle Jigsaw, 1968
 Cry For The Moon, 1970
 Dinkum Bambino, 1970
 The Constant Gardener, c.1970
 Up the Track, 1973
 The Golden Years, 1977

Books

References

External links
 

1993 deaths
Place of birth missing
Year of birth missing
20th-century Australian women writers
Australian soap opera writers
Australian women television writers
Australian women screenwriters
Women soap opera writers
20th-century Australian screenwriters
Australian theatre managers and producers
20th-century Australian dramatists and playwrights